Nasoni Rokobiau, born 29 November 1979, in Vunidawa, Fiji is a rugby union player. Rokobiau has represented Fiji in their rugby sevens team, as well as Fiji in the 15 man form of the game.

He has played for the Fiji national rugby sevens team since 2002, representing his country in many International Rugby Board sevens tournaments. Roko played for Fiji when they won the 2005 Rugby World Cup Sevens. He was included in the squad for the Wellington leg of the 2007 World Sevens Series. He will make a return for the national sevens team to Dubai and George in December 2014. Roko has scored over 100 tries for Fiji in rugby sevens.

He plays in the Colonial Cup for the Suva Highlanders, and has also played in Malaysia, and in New Zealand (for Hawke's Bay in 2004). His performance in the Digicel Cup saw him get selected in the Fiji 15's team to the 2009 Autumn Internationals where he played in the match against Ireland.

References

External links
Profile at teivovo.com

Living people
1979 births
Fijian rugby union players
People from Naitasiri Province
Rugby union wings
Male rugby sevens players
Fijian expatriate rugby union players
Expatriate rugby union players in Malaysia
Expatriate rugby union players in New Zealand
Fijian expatriate sportspeople in Malaysia
Fijian expatriate sportspeople in New Zealand
Fiji international rugby sevens players
I-Taukei Fijian people